Bennie Burns Williams (January 16, 1922 – September 9, 2007) was an American football and basketball coach and college athletics administrator.  He was the ninth head football coach at Howard Payne University  in Brownwood, Texas, serving for six seasons, from 1956 to 1961, and compiling a record of 24–33.

Head coaching record

Football

References

External links
 

1922 births
2007 deaths
Basketball coaches from Texas
Howard Payne Yellow Jackets athletic directors
Howard Payne Yellow Jackets football coaches
Howard Payne Yellow Jackets football players
Howard Payne Yellow Jackets men's basketball coaches
People from Stanton, Texas
Players of American football from Texas